National Route 125 is a national highway of Japan connecting Katori, Chiba and Kumagaya, Saitama in Japan, with a total length of 128.4 km (79.78 mi).

See also

References

External links

125
Roads in Chiba Prefecture
Roads in Ibaraki Prefecture
Roads in Saitama Prefecture